Jason Becker (born May 26, 1974) is a Canadian former ice hockey defenceman who is an assistant coach for the Prince George Cougars in the WHL.

Career statistics

Awards and honours

References

External links

1974 births
Canadian ice hockey defencemen
Fresno Falcons players
Cardiff Devils players
Ice hockey people from Saskatchewan
Kamloops Blazers players
Living people
Reading Royals players
Red Deer Rebels players
Saskatchewan Huskies ice hockey players
Saskatoon Blades players
Sportspeople from Saskatoon
Swift Current Broncos players
Canadian expatriate ice hockey players in Germany
Canadian expatriate ice hockey players in the United States
Canadian expatriate ice hockey players in Wales